There is no officially designated Ljubljana–Zagreb Railway. Information concerning the individual sections of this railway line may be found at:
Dobova–Ljubljana Railway, the section in Slovenia,
M101 railway, the section in Croatia.